The 2012 Savannah Challenger was a professional tennis tournament played on clay courts. It was the fourth edition of the tournament which was part of the 2012 ATP Challenger Tour. It took place in Savannah, United States between 23 and 29 April 2012.

Singles main draw entrants

Seeds

 1 Rankings are as of April 16, 2012.

Other entrants
The following players received wildcards into the singles main draw:
  Bjorn Fratangelo
  Robert Kendrick
  Daniel Kosakowski
  Dmitry Tursunov

The following players received entry from the qualifying draw:
  Brian Baker
  James Lemke
  Blake Strode
  Rhyne Williams

Champions

Singles

 Brian Baker def.  Augustin Gensse, 6–4, 6–3

Doubles

 Carsten Ball /  Bobby Reynolds def.  Travis Parrott /  Simon Stadler, 7–6(9–7), 6–4

External links
Official Website

Savannah Challenger
Savannah Challenger
Tennis tournaments in Georgia (U.S. state)